Mid Valley Airport  (formerly FAA LID T65) is the main airport serving Weslaco, Texas, United States.

In 2021, the city partnered with the Texas Department of Transportation and other agencies to expand the airport, constructing two new hangars and six spaces for jets. The investment cost $19 million and is expected to bring 100 jobs to the community.

Airlines and destinations
There is no scheduled passenger airline service.

Cargo airlines

References

External links

Airports in Texas
Buildings and structures in Hidalgo County, Texas